Mont Alto is a borough in Franklin County, Pennsylvania, United States. The population was 1,580 at the 2020 census.

History
John Funk built the first house in the borough (then unestablished) in 1817 on what is now Main Street. At this time the town was known as "Funkstown". Eventually the town of Altodale and the surrounding area, called Mont Alto, combined into what is now known as Mont Alto.

In 1915 the town of Mont Alto was incorporated with a population of 800.

In the beginning of the 20th century, Mont Alto contained one of the largest sanatoriums in the area for treatment of tuberculosis.

Geography
Mont Alto is located in southeastern Franklin County at  (39.843234, -77.555023). It sits at the western base of South Mountain along the headwaters of the West Branch of Antietam Creek.

Pennsylvania Route 997 passes through the center of town as Main Street; it leads north  to U.S. Route 30 near Fayetteville and south  to Waynesboro. Pennsylvania Route 233 runs east out of the borough as Park Street, leading northeast  to US 30 at Caledonia State Park.

Demographics

As of the census, of 2000, there were 1,357 people, 541 households, and 413 families residing in the borough. The population density was 2,339.5 people per square mile (903.3/km2). There were 576 housing units at an average density of 993.1 per square mile (383.4/km2). The racial makeup of the borough was 97.72% White, 0.96% African American, 0.15% Native American, 0.81% Asian, 0.07% from other races, and 0.29% from two or more races. Hispanic or Latino of any race were 0.22% of the population.

There were 541 households, out of which 33.6% had children under the age of 18 living with them, 63.4% were married couples living together, 10.4% had a female householder with no husband present, and 23.5% were non-families. 20.1% of all households were made up of individuals, and 8.9% had someone living alone who was 65 years of age or older. The average household size was 2.51 and the average family size was 2.87.

In the borough, the population was spread out, with 24.2% under the age of 18, 6.7% from 18 to 24, 33.8% from 25 to 44, 22.4% from 45 to 64, and 12.9% who were 65 years of age or older. The median age was 36 years. For every 100 females there were 95.8 males. For every 100 females age 18 and over, there were 91.1 males.

The median income for a household in the borough was $37,163, and the median income for a family was $41,705. Males had a median income of $32,169 versus $21,579 for females. The per capita income for the borough was $17,216. About 4.0% of families and 4.7% of the population were below the poverty line, including 5.9% of those under age 18 and 6.1% of those age 65 or over.

Colleges and universities
Penn State Mont Alto is located at the intersection of Slabtown Road and Campus Drive; Route 233 passes by the university.

Points of interest 
 Mont Alto Arboretum, on the campus of Penn State Mont Alto
 Mont Alto State Park
 Mont Alto Railroad
 Penn National Golf course
 Twin Kiss

References

External links
 Borough of Mont Alto official website
 Mont Alto Volunteer Fire Department

Populated places established in 1762
Boroughs in Franklin County, Pennsylvania
1915 establishments in Pennsylvania